Saumlaki is a town in Tanimbar Islands Regency, Indonesia. It is the seat of Tanimbar Islands Regency, as well as the biggest town in the island of Yamdena. Previously a small village, it has grown to a relatively sizeable town due to its political status as a regency seat. Most of the regency's infrastructure is concentrated in Saumlaki. The administrative location of the town is in the kelurahan (subdistrict) of Saumlaki, inside South Tanimbar district. The urban settlement extends outside of the administrative boundaries to surrounding subdistricts such as the villages of Olilit and Sifnana.

Geography
The town of Saumlaki does not have a legal administrative boundary. However, the urban population is concentrated on the subdistrict of Saumlaki, which is the town proper. The town extends outside of the proper subdistrict to the neighbouring Olilit and Sifnana. The soil formation in the town consists of limestone formed from dead corals as well as relatively young sediments.

Between April and September, the wind comes from Australia, and is generally drier and causes less rainfall than usual. The average temperature of the town is between 25 and 28 degrees Celsius, with December being the hottest month.

Economy
The main economic sources of the town are agriculture and fishery, including cassava, water spinach, banana, coconut, and pineapple. Livestock farming, mainly of chickens and pigs, also contributes to the economy. About 2,208 tons of fish were caught from waters around Saumlaki in 2020.

The bloc is expected to be managed by Inpex's child company Inpex Masela and production is expected to begin around 2027. However, disagreements over local government ownership of the project have delayed the project. There have been some controversies surrounding the exploration, especially regarding the local government's participation interest that would be obliged to own minimum 10% of production's ownership. The regency government expected to supposedly own 5.6% from the 10% participation interest, but the provincial government in Ambon expected it to be just 3% while the rest would be divided equally to all regencies in the Maluku province. This has caused ongoing conflict between the provincial government and the regency government over the ownership of the company's 10% minimum obliged by the law.

Infrastructure

Education

There are five elementary schools in Saumlaki subdistrict, three in Olilit, and two in Sifnana. There are two junior high schools in Saumlaki, three in Olilit, and one in Sifnana, while the numbers of senior high schools in the town are two in Saumlaki, one in Olilit, and one in Sifnana. There are also four vocational high schools: two in Saumlaki, and one each in Olilit and Sifnana.

In addition, there are three higher education institutions registered with the Ministry of Education, Culture, Research, and Technology: Saumlaki College of Economy, Saumlaki College of Administration, and Saumlaki Teaching College. All three colleges are private and owned by Rumpun Lelemuku Saumlaki Higher Learning Foundation.

There are other higher education institutions in the town, but they are not accredited or registered with the Ministry of Education and residents of the town have been urged to avoid enrolling there as they have no legal standing. The creation of illegal and unregistered colleges in the town has been described by the General Chief of Private College Coordinator, who oversees private colleges under the government, as "like mushrooms growing in the rainy season" and a serious problem to the town. Residents have criticized these colleges for spreading pamphlets around the town  for recruitment and causing confusion among parents.

Healthcare

There are two hospitals in the town, Fatima Hospital located in Saumlaki subdistrict and Dr. P. P. Magretti Saumlaki Regional Hospital located in Olilit. There are also two puskesmas, of which one has inpatient care facilities, and 9 registered pharmacies. The Dr. P. P. Magretti Saumlaki Regional Hospital is a public hospital owned by the regency government and is classified as a D-class hospital by the  Ministry of Health. It is the larger of the two hospitals. Fatima Hospital is privately owned and also classified as D-class.

Transportation
Public transportation in the town consists of angkot that have regular tracks regulated by the regency government. The town is served by the small port of Saumlaki, which has regular routes to neighbouring towns such as Dobo in Aru Islands Regency. In 2021, the Indonesian Navy built a new naval base in the town which includes bigger port facilities capable of handling ships of to 12,000GT. The town was previously served by Olilit Airport, which was later replaced with the bigger Mathilda Batlayeri Airport. The airport served around 24,000 passengers in 2020, both in departures and arrivals. The town is also connected through the Sea Toll Program for passengers and movement of basic goods.

Others
The town is the only place in the district that has banks, which include four state-owned banks, two private banks, and one people's credit bank (BPR).

References

Populated places in Maluku (province)
Regency seats of Maluku (province)